The 2020–21 Ligue 2 season, also known as Ligue 2 BKT for sponsorship reasons, was the 82nd season of second-division football in France, and the 19th season since the division was rebranded as Ligue 2 from Division 2. Due to the uncertainty caused by the COVID-19 pandemic, the announcement of the start and end dates for the season was delayed. There were suggestions that the season would feature just 18 teams, as opposed to the usual 20, after France's highest administrative court overturned the relegations of Amiens and Toulouse from Ligue 1; however, the relegations were reinstated by the General Assembly of the LFP with a vote on 23 June 2020. The league fixtures were announced on 9 July 2020 and the league season began on 22 August 2020 and ended on 15 May 2021.

Teams

Team changes

Stadia and locations

Personnel and kits

Managerial changes

Number of teams by regions

League table

Results

Promotion play-offs
A promotion play-off competition was held at the end of the season, involving the 3rd, 4th and 5th-placed teams in 2020–21 Ligue 2, and the 18th-placed team in 2020–21 Ligue 1.

The quarter-final was played on 18 May and the semi-final was played on 21 May.

Round 1

Round 2

Promotion Play-offs
'1st leg'

'2nd leg'

2–2 on aggregate. Nantes won on away goals and therefore both clubs remained in their respective leagues.

Relegation play-offs
A relegation play-off was held at the end of the season between the 18th-placed team of the 2020–21 Ligue 2 and the 3rd-placed team of the 2020–21 Championnat National. This was played over two legs on 19 and 22 May.

3–3 on aggregate. Niort won on away goals and therefore both clubs remained in their respective leagues.

Top scorers

References

External links
 

Ligue 2 seasons
2
France